Adam M. Niemerg is a Republican member of the Illinois House from the 109th district since January 13, 2021. The 109th district, located in the Illinois Wabash Valley, includes all or parts of Albion, Allendale, Bellmont, Bone Gap, Bridgeport, Browns, Burnt Prairie, Calhoun, Carmi, Cisne, Claremont, Clay City, Crossville, Dieterich, Enfield, Fairfield, Flora, Golden Gate, Grayville, Iola, Jeffersonville, Johnsonville, Keenes, Keensburg, Louisville, Maunie, Montrose, Mount Carmel, Mount Erie, Newton, Noble, Norris City, Olney, Parkersburg, Phillipstown, Rose Hill, Sailor Springs, Sims, Springerton, St. Francisville, Ste. Marie, Sumner, Teutopolis, Watson, Wayne City, West Salem, Wheeler, Willow Hill, Xenia, and Yale.

Niemerg was elected to the 109th district to succeed Republican then-state Representative Darren Bailey after Bailey successfully ran for the Illinois Senate.

Early life, education, and career
Niemerg was born in Teutopolis, Illinois to his parents Phil and Stephanie. He would be the oldest of five children. He graduated from Teutopolis High School in 2002. He would attend Lake Land College until later attending Eastern Illinois University and earned his Bachelor of Arts in history. After graduating, he would work as a senior claims adjuster for Country Financial for 12 years. He is a member of the American Farm Bureau Federation. In the aftermath of the storming of the US Capitol by a mob of Trump supporters, Niemerg condemned the violence. However, Niemerg claimed there was "credible questions" surrounding the results of the 2020 presidential election.

As of July 3, 2022, Representative Niemerg is a member of the following Illinois House committees:

 Appropriations - General Service Committee (HAPG)
 Cybersecurity, Data Analytics, & IT Committee (HCDA)
 Health Care Availability & Access Committee (HHCA)
 Housing Committee (SHOU)
 Insurance Committee (HINS)
 Labor & Commerce Committee (HLBR)
 Minority Impact Analysis Subcommittee (HLBR-MIAS)

Electoral history

Personal life
Niemerg currently resides in Teutopolis with his wife Trina and two children. He and his family are "members of the St. Isidore Catholic Parish and they attend St. Aloysius Church."

References

External links
Representative Adam Niemerg (R) at the Illinois General Assembly
Constituent Website

21st-century American politicians
American Roman Catholics
Catholics from Illinois
Living people
Republican Party members of the Illinois House of Representatives
Eastern Illinois University alumni
1984 births